Golulan-e Sofla (also Romanized as Golūlān-e Soflá; also known as Galūlān and Golūlān) is a village in Il Gavark Rural District of the Central District of Bukan County, West Azerbaijan province, Iran. At the 2006 National Census, its population was 464 in 76 households. The following census in 2011 counted 429 people in 114 households. The latest census in 2016 showed a population of 402 people in 115 households; it was the largest village in its rural district.

References 

Bukan County

Populated places in West Azerbaijan Province

Populated places in Bukan County